Jan August Kisielewski (8 February 1876 in Rzeszów – 29 January 1918 in Warsaw), was a Polish writer, essayist and playwright associated with the Young Poland literary movement at the turn of the century. He was the co-founder of a legendary literary cabaret Zielony Balonik in Kraków under the Austrian rule during the final years of the Partitions of Poland. Jan August Kisielewski was a brother of Zygmunt Kisielewski of the Polish Legions in World War I, also a writer.

Plays by Jan August Kisielewski
 Parias (Pariah), 1896 – lost
 Karykatury (Caricatures), 1898
 W sieci (In the Net), 1896
 Ostatnie spotkanie (The Last Meeting), 1896
 Sonata, 1901
 Komedia miłości i cnoty (The Comedy of Love and Chastity), 1903 – unfinished

Notes and references

Polish male writers
1876 births
1918 deaths
Burials at Powązki Cemetery